Nitromemantine (developmental code name YQW-36) is a derivative of memantine developed in 2006 for the treatment of Alzheimer's disease. It has been shown to reduce excitotoxicity mediated by over-activation of the glutamatergic system, by blocking NMDA receptors.

Pharmacology
Like memantine, nitromemantine is a low-affinity voltage-dependent uncompetitive antagonist at glutamatergic NMDA receptors, however nitromemantine selectively inhibits extrasynaptic NMDA receptors while sparing normal physiological synaptic NMDA receptor activity, resulting in less side effects and a greater neuroprotective action, as well as stimulating regrowth of synapses with prolonged administration. The discoverers of nitromemantine have demonstrated that the amyloid-β peptide associated with Alzheimer's disease acts as an agonist at α7 nicotinic acetylcholine receptors, chronic overstimulation of which then results in uncontrolled release of glutamate, and consequent excitotoxicity. By blocking extrasynaptic NMDA receptors, nitromemantine is able to largely prevent this excitotoxicity while minimising the side effects usually seen with less selective NMDA antagonists. The nitrate group of nitromemantine was found to bind to a second site on the extrasynaptic NMDA receptor which had previously been targeted with nitroglycerin, and this double action is thought to be responsible for the increased effectiveness of nitromemantine.

See also 
 Memantine
 Neramexane
 Amantadine

References 

Adamantanes
Amines
Antidementia agents
NMDA receptor antagonists
Nitrate esters